Kota Alam Shah was a state constituency in Selangor, Malaysia and was first represented in the Selangor State Legislative Assembly in 2004.

History 
It was abolished in 2004 when it was redistributed.

Representation history

Results

References 

 

Defunct Selangor state constituencies
2003 establishments in Malaysia
2018 disestablishments in Malaysia